Jeff Lumby (born 1956) is a Canadian actor. He is a member of the Lumby family, who created and produced the 1980s Canadian children's television series, Size Small, where he performed as various characters and as a puppeteer. Lumby played "Winston Rothschild III", the septic tank and sewer technician character on The Red Green Show and Duct Tape Forever.

Career
Lumby is involved in Skatoony on Teletoon. Skatoony which was originally developed in the UK debuted in Canada in 2010 and Jeff voices one of the new additions to the North American version, Studio Executive and Producer, Charles La Puck. Jeff has provided animated voices to many projects over the years, including the Mad scientist role of Professor Tomoe in the Cloverway dub adaptation of the Sailor Moon anime series in season three; his sister, Lisa Lumby-Richards (who appeared on Size Small as "Grandma Gussie"), was a screenwriter for the adaptation.

For eight years, he was a radio personality on Hamilton, Ontario station CJXY-FM, the rock station that was then Y95.3. He subsequently co-hosted the morning show on Toronto country radio station CISS-FM prior to its 1999 flip to contemporary hit radio. In January 2007, he returned to radio as lead morning host of radio station CJDV-FM, 107.5 Dave FM, a Corus Entertainment Radio Station broadcasting from the Tri-Cities of Cambridge/Kitchener/Waterloo, Ontario. He has since left.

On July 5, 2010, Lumby became the interim morning show host on sports radio station The FAN 590 in Toronto after the station fired its long running morning show duo of Don Landry and former Toronto Maple Leafs General Manager Gord Stellick. He hosted on an interim basis until a permanent replacement for Landry & Stellick was found. Andrew Krystal was later named the eventual replacement as host for the FAN 590's morning show.

In April 2012, Lumby joined the "New Kool Morning Crew", heard on 105.3 Kool FM in Kitchener/Waterloo.

Filmography

Live action roles

Voice over roles

References

External links
 
 Jeff Lumby's Dave FM Blog Page
 

1956 births
Living people
Canadian male film actors
Canadian male television actors
Canadian male voice actors
Canadian radio personalities
Male actors from Toronto
20th-century Canadian male actors
21st-century Canadian male actors